Peter Michael Jory (born 4 February 1974) is a British sport shooter from the island of Guernsey.

Biography

Early life
Born and raised in Guernsey, Jory attended Elizabeth College. At the school, Jory shot with the combined cadet force at the schools' meeting at Bisley. Jory was a member of the British Cadet Rifle Team for their tour to Canada in 1992. He later graduated from the University of Southampton with a degree in Engineering.

Shooting career
Jory is among the most capped Guernsey shooters at the NRA Imperial Meeting. In 2001, Jory set the record individual score in the Mackinnon international long-range match, scoring 100.17v (ex 100.20v), though this was later broken by Glyn Barnett in 2019, who scored 100.19v.

Jory won two silver medals at the 2003 Island Games in both the individual and pairs fullbore rifle shooting events.

Jory represented Guernsey at the 2002, 2006, 2010 and 2014 editions of the Commonwealth Games, entering both fullbore rifle events, namely the Queen's prize pairs and the Queen's prize individual competitions. His best results came in 2002 where he finished 7th in the fullbore singles event and 4th in the fullbore pairs event alongside Nick Mace. He finished 4th again in the pairs event in 2010, this time shooting alongside his brother, Adam Jory.

In 2020, Jory was appointed as shooting coach at his alma mater, Elizabeth College.

Motorsport
A popular figure in motorsport in Guernsey, Jory suffered a fractured vertebra following a crash while co-driving in the Guernsey Rally in March 2020, though he was not expected to suffer any lasting damage from the incident.

Statistics

International competitions

References

1974 births
Living people
Shooters at the 2002 Commonwealth Games
Shooters at the 2006 Commonwealth Games
Shooters at the 2010 Commonwealth Games
Shooters at the 2014 Commonwealth Games
British male sport shooters
People educated at Elizabeth College, Guernsey
Commonwealth Games competitors for Guernsey